TSA PreCheck (branded as TSA Pre✓) is a Trusted Traveler program initiated in December 2013 and administered by the U.S. Transportation Security Administration that allows selected members of select frequent flyer programs, members of Global Entry, Free and Secure Trade, NEXUS, and SENTRI, members of the US military, and cadets and midshipmen of the United States service academies to receive expedited screening for domestic and select international itineraries. As of March 2019, this program was available at more than 300 airports.

After completing a background check, being fingerprinted, and paying an $85 fee, travelers will get a Known Traveler Number. TSA does not issue an ID card like Global Entry, NEXUS, and SENTRI do. Travelers are notified if they have PreCheck by having a indicator printed on their boarding pass that may say "TSAPRECHK", "TSA PRE", or "TSA Pre✓®" depending on the airline and type of boarding pass.

The program has led to complaints of unfairness and longer wait lines. TSA says that PreCheck is not guaranteed every flight, as passengers are subject to random exclusions. Furthermore, passengers may be disqualified or suspended from PreCheck for violations of federal transportation security regulations.
The TSA maintains a list of credit card issuers and loyalty programs that reimburse members' TSA PreCheck or Global Entry application fees.

In 2023, the TSA announced two major milestones for PreCheck. The first is that the TSA PreCheck application program has surpassed 15 million active members, officially setting a new record for membership. The seconds is that more than 19,200 individuals applied for membership on Feb. 21, 2023, which breaks the record for any single day in the program’s history.

Participating airlines 
As of June 2022, a total of 82 airlines participate in the program.

References 

Transportation Security Administration
United States Department of Homeland Security